Adam Łagiewka  (born 8 January 1982) is a Polish footballer who plays for Polonia/Sparta Świdnica in the III liga.

Łagiewka began his professional career with Zagłębie Lubin in the Ekstraklasa during the 2001-02 season, appearing in 3 matches.

External links
 

1982 births
Living people
Polish footballers
Zagłębie Lubin players
Place of birth missing (living people)
Jarota Jarocin players
Association football forwards